Johnny Quick is the name of two fictional DC Comics characters, each with the power of superhuman speed. The first was a superhero who first appeared in More Fun Comics #71 (September 1941) during the Golden Age. The other was a supervillain, an evil version of the Flash from Earth-Three, originally appearing during the Silver Age. The Golden Age hero has been mostly forgotten, apart from occasional flashback material, while versions of the Crime Syndicate Johnny Quick have continued to appear throughout the modern age.

Johnny Quick (Johnny Chambers)

Johnny Quick appeared in More Fun Comics from issue #71 to 107 (September 1941-January 1946), and also appeared in Adventure Comics from #103 to 207 (April 1946-Dec 1954).

Chambers is a newsreel photographer who invokes his power by reciting a mathematical formula ("3X2(9YZ)4A") taught to him by his childhood guardian, Professor Gill, who had in turn derived it from inscriptions found in a Pharaoh's tomb. After learning the secret to gaining superhuman speed, Johnny chooses to work as a mystery-man.

He was a prominent member of the All-Star Squadron as well as husband to Liberty Belle. His daughter, Jesse Chambers, assumed his speed mantra and became Jesse Quick and served a short while with the Titans.

After World War II, he periodically was active as a superhero, having encountered Savitar.

He ultimately entered the Speed Force, saving his daughter from Lady Flash - then called Lady Savitar.

Later, he was "seemingly" reanimated during the 2009-10 DC comics "Blackest Night" story arc for a short time, but after his daughter Jesse Quick realized that the man in front of her was just an evil mockery of his former self and that his resurrection was a false one, he was forcibly laid to rest again.

Johnny Quick (Crime Syndicate)

Crime Syndicate of America
Johnny Quick was a supervillain on the alternate Earth designated as Earth-Three, but rather than being a counterpart of the Earth-Two Johnny Quick, he was a version of the Flash. He and the other members of the Crime Syndicate of America (all of whom were villainous counterparts of Justice League of America members) were Earth-Three's only superpowered beings, and had never been defeated by Earth-Three's primary hero, Alexander Luthor (a heroic counterpart to Superman's nemesis Lex Luthor). They travelled to Earth-1 as they were out of shape from inactivity, but were defeated by the JLA, with Quick being defeated by Batman. They were also defeated by the JSA, on Earth-2, but using a trick they imprisoned the JSA and battled the JLA again, where the Flash defeated Quick by making him work up so much speed he couldn't control it and collapsed. The Crime Syndicate were then imprisoned by Green Lantern in the vibratory barriers between Earth-1 and Earth-2. Once they were released by time-traveling villain Per Degaton to help him change history and take over Earth-2, though they tried to overthrow him. They tried to get him, but he revealed he had made sure he and his Time Machine would vibrate at a different speed to them, meaning they couldn't touch him. They told him who they were, and he decided to use them. He then made them steal nuclear missiles from the Cuban Missile Crisis of 1962 on Earth-Prime and brought them back in time to Earth-Two's 1942 by towing them behind his time machine, not caring about the fact war would happen due to this. When they tried to defeat him, they were hurled into 1982 of Earth-1, as he had made sure this would happen if any of them touched him. They materialized on the JLA's satellite headquarters, and defeated the heroes. The JLA traveled to the past and teamed up with the JSA and All-Star Squadron to prevent Per Degaton's plan. When Per Degaton was defeated, these events were erased from existence. Like the rest of the Crime Syndicate, Johnny Quick perished during the Crisis at the hands of the Anti-Monitor when a wave of antimatter destroyed Earth-Three.

During the "Convergence" storyline, Johnny Quick was with the Crime Syndicate when they planned to free Superwoman from death row.

Crime Syndicate of America

The character was revived in the 1990s as a villain from the "Anti-Matter Universe", rather than being from Earth-Three. Unlike the Flash, Johnny receives his powers by injecting himself with a drug called "Speed Juice" (whether this is a variation of the super-speed inducing drug "Velocity 9" from the regular Flash's Earth is not known). This Johnny Quick is the counterpart of the Wally West Flash. According to Grant Morrison, who created this version of the character, he had a predecessor (corresponding to Barry Allen), whose blood was used to create the Speed Juice. A flashback to the early days of the Crime Syndicate showed this character as resembling the Pre-Crisis version. While Quick is part of that Earth's "Ruling Elite", he is hopelessly addicted to "Speed Juice" and goes into massive physical withdrawal without it. As part of the tribute the world's leaders present the Crime Syndicate with on a regular basis, they supply Quick with fresh supplies of his drug, sometimes altered to be more euphoric.

In Justice League of America (vol. 2) #51, Jesse Chambers says "This Johnny Quick has my father's face", implying that the name is more than coincidence and that the New Earth Johnny Quick, and the "original" (Barry Allen counterpart) Antimatter Johnny Quick are genetically the same person.

Crime Society of America

In 52 Week 52, an alternate version of Earth-Three (called Earth-3) was shown as a part of the new Multiverse. In the depiction were characters that are altered versions of the original Justice League of America, including the Flash. The names of the characters and the team are not mentioned in the two panels in which they appear, but the altered Flash is visually similar to the Crime Syndicate Johnny Quick.

Based on comments by Grant Morrison, this alternate universe is not the pre-Crisis Earth-Three, making this a new character unrelated to previous versions. Earth-3 is a world populated by evil counterparts of Earth-2 heroes, where Johnny Quick is part of a "Golden Age" "Crime Society".

The New 52
In The New 52 rebooted DC's continuity (launched in 2011), Johnny Quick is one of the members of the Crime Syndicate to arrive from Earth 3 at the conclusion of the "Trinity War" event. Johnny Quick, known as Jonathan Allen on Earth 3, works with Rhonda Pineda as professional thieves and killers. One night after killing two cops, "Johnny and Rhonnie", as they are known, end up cornered on the roof of S.T.A.R. Labs during a storm. Lightning hits a satellite, electrocuting Johnny, causing him to gain his powers, while Rhonda also gains hers by falling into the lab near Ray Palmer's Atomico work.

During the Forever Evil storyline, Johnny Quick invades Iron Heights Penitentiary and frees its inmates at the time when the Rogues were in the middle of freeing Trickster. When Lex Luthor's team infiltrates the fallen Watchtower, Johnny Quick joins in the fight against them where Captain Cold uses his cold-gun to freeze Johnny Quick's leg and break it off. When Alexander Luthor of Earth-3 is freed and becomes Mazahs, he kills Johnny Quick and steals his powers.

During the "Year of the Villain" event, Johnny Quick and Earth 3 were revived. When Perpetua arrived on Earth 3 in order to get the Crime Syndicate of America on her side, Johnny Quick was against this idea and was killed by Perpetua as he began to run away.

During the "Dark Nights: Death Metal" storyline, Batman was able to revive Johnny Quick using a Black Lantern ring so that he would help fight the forces of the Darkest Knight.

Infinite Frontier
Following the reboot of the multiverse after Dark Nights: Death Metal, a new Earth-3 and Johnny Quick are created. This Johnny Quick is a serial killer who uses his superspeed to go on a murder spree across Central City, accompanied by his girlfriend Atomica.

Powers and abilities
Each of the characters that were named Johnny Quick possess super-speed.

The Crime Syndicate version of Johnny Quick possesses the same abilities as Flash.

In other media
 The Crime Syndicate incarnation of Johnny Quick appears in Justice League: Crisis on Two Earths, voiced by James Patrick Stuart. This version's suit resembles that of the Reverse-Flash and is of Australian origin. While subjugating his Earth, he and the Crime Syndicate battle the Justice League until Owlman betrays the syndicate to destroy Earth-Prime and the multiverse and Quick sacrifices himself to transport Batman to Earth-Prime.
 The Crime Syndicate incarnation of Johnny Quick appears in Lego DC Super-Villains, voiced by Anthony Ingruber. After the Justice League go missing, he and the Crime Syndicate pose as the Justice Syndicate until the Flash and Reverse-Flash corner him and force him to expose the Crime Syndicate's plans.

References

External links
 Johnny Quick entry on DCDatabaseProject
 Earth-3 Johnny Quick entry on DCDatabaseProject

Characters created by Mort Weisinger
Comics characters introduced in 1964
DC Comics metahumans
DC Comics characters who can move at superhuman speeds
DC Comics characters with superhuman senses
DC Comics male superheroes
DC Comics male supervillains
Fictional Australian people
Fictional characters from parallel universes
Fictional characters who can turn invisible
Fictional characters who can turn intangible
Fictional characters with air or wind abilities
Fictional characters with density control abilities
Fictional dictators
Fictional mass murderers
Characters created by Gardner Fox
Characters created by Mike Sekowsky
Flash (comics) characters
Fictional drug addicts